Zvara is a surname. Notable people with the surname include:

Dávid Zvara (born 1994), Hungarian footballer
Ján Zvara (born 1963), Slovak high jumper
Vladislav Zvara (born 1971), Slovak footballer

Slovak-language surnames